Justice Hines may refer to:
 Geraldine Hines, associate justice of the Massachusetts Supreme Judicial Court
 Harris Hines (1943–2018), chief justice of the Georgia Supreme Court
 James K. Hines, associate justice of the Supreme Court of Georgia